The 2000 Pontins Professional was a professional invitational snooker tournament which took place in May 2000 in Prestatyn, Wales.

The tournament featured eight professional players. The quarter-final matches were contested over the best of 9 frames, the semi-finals best of eleven and the final best of seventeen.

The 2000 tournament was the twenty-seventh and final edition of the Pontins Professional, the series being discontinued thereafter.

Darren Morgan won the event,by defeating Jimmy White 9–2 in the final.

Main draw
Results from the tournament are shown below.

Final

Century breaks
Century breaks from the tournament are shown below.
122, 101, 101  Jimmy White
119  Darren Morgan
116  Matthew Stevens
106  Paul Hunter

References

Pontins Professional
Snooker competitions in Wales
Pontins Professional
Pontins Professional
Pontins Professional